Antti Kukkonen (3 October 1889, Kontiolahti - 14 February 1978) was a Finnish Lutheran pastor and politician. He was a member of the Agrarian League. He served as Deputy Minister of Education in Lauri Ingman's second cabinet (31 May 1924 - 22 November 1924), as Minister of Education in Juho Sunila's first cabinet (17 December 1927 - 22 December 1928), in Kyösti Kallio's third cabinet (16 August 1929 - 4 July 1930), in Juho Sunila's second cabinet (21 March 1931 - 14 December 1932), in Kyösti Kallio's fourth cabinet (7 October 1936 - 12 March 1937), in Risto Ryti's second cabinet (27 March 1940 - 4 December 1941) and in Jukka Rangell's cabinet (4 January 1941 - 5 March 1943) as well as a Member of Parliament (1 April 1919 - 5 April 1945 and 29 March 1954 - 19 February 1962).

Kukkonen was sentenced to 2 years of imprisonment in the war-responsibility trials in Finland. He was released in October 1947.

References 
 

1889 births
1978 deaths
People from Kontiolahti
People from Kuopio Province (Grand Duchy of Finland)
20th-century Finnish Lutheran clergy
Centre Party (Finland) politicians
Ministers of Education of Finland
Members of the Parliament of Finland (1919–22)
Members of the Parliament of Finland (1922–24)
Members of the Parliament of Finland (1924–27)
Members of the Parliament of Finland (1927–29)
Members of the Parliament of Finland (1929–30)
Members of the Parliament of Finland (1930–33)
Members of the Parliament of Finland (1933–36)
Members of the Parliament of Finland (1936–39)
Members of the Parliament of Finland (1939–45)
Members of the Parliament of Finland (1954–58)
Members of the Parliament of Finland (1958–62)
Finnish people of World War II
Finnish prisoners and detainees
Recipients of Finnish presidential pardons
University of Helsinki alumni

Prisoners and detainees of Finland